The Post Office Act (enacted June 8, 1872) formally incorporated the United States Post Office Department into the Cabinet of the United States. It is also notable for §148 which made it illegal to send any obscene or disloyal materials through the mail, to be the foundation of the later Comstock Act of 1873.

References

1872 in American law
obscenity law
United States federal postal legislation